Comazzo is a comune (municipality) in the Province of Lodi in the Italian region Lombardy, located about  east of Milan and about  northwest of Lodi.

Comazzo borders the following municipalities: Truccazzano, Rivolta d'Adda, Liscate, Settala, Merlino.

References

External links
 www.comunedicomazzo.it/

Cities and towns in Lombardy